Xenorhabdus eapokensis  is a Gram-negative and rod-shaped bacterium from the genus of Xenorhabdus which has been isolated from the nematodes Steinernema sangi and Steinernema eapokense from soil from Vietnam.

References

External links
Type strain of Xenorhabdus eapokensis at BacDive -  the Bacterial Diversity Metadatabase

 

Bacteria described in 2017